Rampton is a village in the civil parish of Rampton and Woodbeck, about  east of Retford in the Bassetlaw district, in the county of Nottinghamshire, England. Its eastern boundary is the River Trent, which here also forms the county boundary with Lincolnshire.

The parish was renamed from Rampton to Rampton and Woodbeck on the 1st of April 2018.

The 2011 Census recorded the parish population as 1,139.

History
The toponym "Rampton" is probably derived from Old English Ramm-tūn, meaning "farmstead where rams are kept".

The village was an important manor from Norman times. The old manor house was pulled down around 1720, having been held by the Stanhope and Babington families. All that survives is the gateway, which includes the arms of Babington.

On the eastern boundary of All Saints' churchyard is a mid-16th-century Tudor gateway to Old Manor Farm. It is brick with terracotta panels and is a Grade I listed building. It used to lead to the manor house, which was demolished about 1851.

The station opened in 1850 and closed in 1959.

Parish church
The oldest part of the Church of England parish church of All Saints is a 10th-century Anglo-Saxon column in its north arcade. Most of the building is Gothic or later, from the 13th to 17th centuries. The building was restored in 1894.

The west tower is 13th-century and has a ring of six bells. George I Oldfield of Nottingham cast the third bell in 1622 and the fifth bell in 1635. Thomas Hilton of Wath-upon-Dearne cast the fourth bell in 1809. John Taylor & Co of Loughborough cast the treble, second and tenor bells in 1947. The church is a Grade I listed building.

All Saints' parish is part of the Benefice of Retford Area Team Ministry.

Amenities
Rampton has a pub, the Eyre Arms, and a primary school.

References

Sources and further reading

External links

Villages in Nottinghamshire
Bassetlaw District